

The Short S.81 was an experimental British gun-carrying pusher biplane seaplane, ordered from Short Brothers by the British Admiralty in 1913 for use by the Royal Naval Air Service.

The seaplane, manufacturers serial number S.81, was built at Eastchurch and allocated the military serial number 126. S.81 was delivered to Calshot on 25 May 1914 and accepted by the Navy on 2 June 1914. It had three-bay wings with overhanging upper wings, and was powered by a 160 hp (119 kW) Gnome rotary engine. It was first fitted with a 1½ pounder (37 mm) semi-automatic Vickers quick-firing gun in July 1914. Tests with this gun showed that recoil was severe, with claims that firing the gun would induce a stall. It was fitted with a number of different guns for trials, testing a six-pounder (57 mm) Davis gun (an early recoilless gun) in 1915. In 1915 it had a dynamo and searchlight fitted. No longer needed for trials, it was deleted from the inventory in October 1915.

Specifications

Operators

Royal Naval Air Service

See also

References

Notes

Bibliography

 Bruce, J.M. British Aeroplanes 1914–18. London:Putnam, 1957.
 Mason, Francis K. The British Fighter since 1912. Annapolis, Maryland, USA: Naval Institute Press, 1992. .
 Ray Sturtivant and Gordon Page Royal Navy Aircraft Serials and Units 1911-1919 Air-Britain, 1992. .
 Williams, Anthony G. and Emmanuel Gustin. Flying Guns World War I. Ramsbury, UK:Airlife Publishing, 2003. .

1910s British experimental aircraft
Short Brothers aircraft
Floatplanes
Biplanes
Single-engined pusher aircraft
Rotary-engined aircraft
Aircraft first flown in 1914